The European Para Youth Games (EPYG) is a biennial multi-sport event for young para-athletes aged between 13 and 23 from the member countries of the European Paralympic Committee (EPC).

Editions

See also
European Para Championships
European Youth Olympic Festival

References

External links
European Paralympic Committee - Events
2022 European Para Youth Games

 
Disabled multi-sport events
European youth sports competitions
Youth multi-sport events
Multi-sport events in Europe
Multi-sport events